Thomas Williams Jr. (born August 25, 1987) is an American professional boxer from Fort Washington, Maryland. He challenged for the WBC and Lineal light heavyweight titles in 2016.

Professional career
Williams turned professional at 2010 after a strong amateur career. He is managed by 2012 Boxing Writers Association of America Manager of the Year Al Haymon.

Early career 
A 23-year-old Williams made his debut as a light heavyweight on November 6, 2010, at the Jaycees Community Center, Waldorf, Maryland against 34-year-old Daniel Shull in a scheduled 4-round bout. Williams won via unanimous decision (40-35, 40-35 and 40-36) on all three judges scorecards. In 2011, Williams fought a total of five times, winning all of them, his opponents, Bennie Meeks, who Williams beat via first-round TKO, Mark Anderson via points, Lee Lee Pender via 1st-round knockout, Donnie Moore via 1st-round knockout and Reynaldo Rodriguez via 2nd-round knockout.

Rise up the ranks 
Williams faced his toughest test on November 26, 2013, at the BB&t Center in Sunrise, Florida against former two-time world title challenger Yusaf Mack (31-6-2, 17 KOs) in a scheduled 10-round fight. The fight went the distance with Williams winning via unanimous decision, the three judges scored it (99-91, 98-92 & 97-92). Williams next fought 32 year old Cornelius White (21-2, 16 KOs) on January 24, 2014, at the Little Creek Casino Resort, Washington for vacant WBO NABO light heavyweight title. All the action took place in round 1 as Williams was knocked down first; however, Williams recovered and managed to knockdown White twice as the referee waved the fight off after 2 minutes and 49 seconds of round 1. On April 24, 2014, Williams defeated Enrique Ornelas (34-6, 22 KOs) via 3rd-round knockout.

Williams defended his WBO NABO title against 35 year old Spanish boxer Gabriel Campillo (23-6-1, 10 KOs) on August 1, 2014. Williams was ahead on 2 scorecards after 5 rounds (49-46, 49-46 and 47-48), but never came out for round 6, resulting in his first loss as a professional, bringing his record to 17 wins, with 1 loss. This fight was also an IBF Eliminator for the #2 spot. Following his loss against Campillo, Williams reached out to famed boxing trainer and commentator, Theodore "Teddy" Atlas, and received advice that the test of a man and of a champion is, "...what you do after this, what you learn from this, [and] what you do from this moment on." This advice was not lost on Williams.

Williams fought four months later in December against experienced 35-year-old Michael Gbenga at UIC Pavilion in Chicago. The fight went a full 10 rounds as Williams was announced the winner unanimously 98–91 on all three scorecards. After 11 months hiatus, Williams returned to the ring in November 2015 at the Beau Rivage Resort & Casino, Biloxi, Mississippi against Umberto Savigne (12-2, 9 KOs). Savigne and Williams were both knocked down in round one. Savigne was down again in round 2 as referee Keith Hughes waved the fight off.

Williams vs. Rodriguez 
Williams returned to the ring on April 30, 2016, on the undercard of Ortiz-Berto at the StubHub Center, Carson, California in a scheduled 10-round fight against former world title challenger Edwin Rodriguez (28-1, 19 KOs), whose only career loss was to undefeated super-middleweight champion Andre Ward. The fight was initially due to take place on the Thurman-Porter undercard on March 12 at the Mohegan Sun Casino in Uncasville, Connecticut. The fight was postponed after Thurman was involved in a car accident. The fight lasted 6 minutes, as Rodriguez was knocked down twice in round 2.

Consecutive defeats

Williams vs. Stevenson 
Promoter Yvon Michel announced on June 16, 2016, Williams would challenge 38-year-old lineal and WBC World light heavyweight champion Adonis Stevenson (27-1, 22 KOs) on July 29 at the Videotron Centre in Quebec City. This was Stevenson's seventh title defense. Williams weighed in the heaviest of the two at 174.6lbs with Stevenson in at 173.6lbs. In a brief slug fest,  Stevenson knocked out Williams in round 4 to retain his titles in his seventh successful defense. Stevenson connected with a hard left to Williams' head in round one that floored him with approximately 30 seconds left, however Williams beat the referees count and survived the round. In round 4, Stevenson concentrated much of his attack to Williams body, even hitting an accidental low blow halting the fight for a timeout whilst he recovered. When the fight resumed, Stevenson continued to attack to the body. Whilst groggy, Stevenson connected with a left to the head, dropping Williams for a final time. The time of stoppage was six seconds before the end of the round.

Williams vs. Browne 
On February 18, 2017, Williams lost his second consecutive fight. He was knocked down three times and eventually stopped in round 6 of the scheduled 10 round bout against prospect Marcus Browne (18-0, 13 KOs). Browne was ranked #11 by the WBC and WBO and #13 by the IBF at light heavyweight. The fight took place at the Cintas Center in Cincinnati, Ohio. A the time of stoppage, Williams was behind on all three judges scorecards (49-4, 3 times), with Browne being deducted a point for hitting Williams after knocking him down with a jab. The referee counted to ten but quickly realized his error and gave Williams five minutes to recover and still counting the knockdown and taking the point. Browne earned a purse of $65,000 whilst Williams received the smaller amount of $35,000. Following the fight, Browne called out WBC and Lineal light heavyweight champion Adonis Stevenson, who had previously knocked out Williams.

Williams vs. Torres 
After a full year out, Williams returned on the undercard of Victor Ortiz vs. Devon Alexander on 17 February 2018 at the Don Haskins Center in El Paso, Texas. Williams suffered his third consecutive stoppage defeat, losing to Mexican boxer Humberto Velazco Torres. Williams was knocked out for the ten-count in round 4.

Professional boxing record

Personal 

Williams is the son of former heavyweight contender Thomas "Top Dawg" Williams Sr.

References

External links

Biography of Thomas Williams Jr. on Premier Boxing Champions website
Unofficial website of Thomas "Top Dog" Williams Jr.
Thomas Williams Jr - Profile, News Archive & Current Rankings at Box.Live

Living people
1987 births
American male boxers
African-American boxers
Light-heavyweight boxers
People from Fort Washington, Maryland
Boxers from Maryland
21st-century African-American sportspeople
20th-century African-American people